Notiodes punctatus is a species of marsh weevil in the family Erirhinidae, although it is often treated as a member of the family Brachyceridae. It is found in North America.

References

Further reading

External links

 

Brachyceridae